Ha-101 may refer to:

, a class of Imperial Japanese Navy transport submarines constructed during World War II
, an Imperial Japanese Navy submarine in commission from 1944 to 1945